The Slepcev Storch is a Serbian type-certified, kit and ultralight STOL aircraft, designed by Yugoslavian-Australian Nestor Slepcev and currently produced by Storch Aircraft Serbia in several different versions. The ultralight version is a 3/4 scale replica of the Fieseler Fi 156 Storch of the Second World War and is supplied as a kit for amateur construction or as a complete ready-to-fly-aircraft.

Design and development
The aircraft was first flown in 1994. It was originally manufactured by Slepcev's company, Slepcev Aircraft Industry of Beechwood, New South Wales, Australia. The company was later renamed  Storch Aviation Australia. The aircraft was type-certified in 1999 to the Joint Airworthiness Requirements - Very Light Aircraft (JAR-VLA) standard, with contributions from aeronautical engineer C. W. "Bill" Whitney.  Production then moved to Serbia where a Fédération Aéronautique Internationale microlight category model was developed.

Like the original Fi 156, the Slepcev Storch features a strut-braced high-wing, a two-seats-in-tandem enclosed cockpit, with extensive glazing, fixed conventional landing gear and a single engine in tractor configuration. It is made from welded steel tubing with its flying surfaces fashioned from sheet aluminium and covered in doped aircraft fabric. The wings are supported by V-struts and jury struts. Engines fitted vary by model.

Operational history

The designer has a keen interest in Second World War history and wanted to use an example of his Storch design to re-enact the 12 September 1943 rescue of Benito Mussolini by Otto Skorzeny and his SS commandos from his imprisonment by Italian Carabinieri guards on the Gran Sasso mountain. It took Slepcev a year to gain Italian approvals for the flight and on 24 August 1996, he landed a Storch Mk 4 at the site, 53 years after the original dramatic rescue had taken place.

Variants
Storch/Storch Mk 4
Certification includes Australian and Spanish JAR-VLA. Available as a kit or as ready-to-fly.
Storch Microlight
Available as a kit or as ready-to-fly.
Super Storch
Available as a kit only.
Storch Moose
Available as a kit only.

Specifications (Microlight)

See also

References

External links

Official website archives on Archive.org 

1990s Serbian ultralight aircraft
Homebuilt aircraft
Single-engined tractor aircraft
High-wing aircraft
STOL aircraft
Aircraft first flown in 1994